Roberto Carrión Pollit (7 November 1929 – 17 April 2007) was a Peruvian politician in the late 1970s. He was the mayor of Lima from 1978 to 1979.

References

 

1929 births
2007 deaths
Mayors of Lima